Clube Atlético Linense, commonly referred to as Linense, is a Brazilian professional association football club based in Lins, São Paulo. The team competes in the Campeonato Paulista Série A2, the second tier of the São Paulo state football league.

Founded on June 12, 1927, it was reorganized on February 11, 1930. Their colors are red, white and black. They won the Campeonato Paulista Second Division in 1952, and the Série A-2 (Second Division) in 2010, returning to the First Division in 2011, what has not happened since 1957.

They are the club that showed Leivinha, idol of Portuguesa, Palmeiras, the Brazil national team and Atlético Madrid, was also the club that held the first international transfer of Brazilian striker Americo Murolo trading with Italy. Has one of the most curious football mascots of São Paulo state, which it is intimately connected. Some episodes characteristic of the players involved a parade of circus elephants on site after winning the league's second division in 1952. In 2000, there was a parade of elephants from the track's premises Estádio Gilberto Siqueira Lopes.

The club announced the launch of a professional basketball team, which will begin playing in the second tier division of São Paulo state basketball. In January 2015, it is also expected that Clube Atlético Linense will join Liga Ouro, the second division of Brazil's national basketball league known as NBB.

Current squad

Supporters
The supporters of the Clube Atlético Linense is, in proportional terms, one of the largest in Brazil. A poll conducted by TV TEM, the local affiliate of Rede Globo, found that only in the city of Lins, whose estimated population in 2007 was 70,000 inhabitants, there are approximately 45,00 fans known as atleticanos. The team is also known to regularly carry more than 15% of its population, i.e. 12,000 people at a football stadium, an achievement considered unique in the whole national territory.

Achievements 
 Copa Paulista
 Winners (1): 2015
 Campeonato Paulista Série A2
 Winners (2): 1952, 2010
 Campeonato Paulista Série A3
 Winners (1): 2021

References

External links
Official website

Football clubs in São Paulo (state)
Association football clubs established in 1927
1927 establishments in Brazil